Mikayla Hyde (born 12 January 2002) is an Australian rules footballer playing for the Fremantle Football Club in the AFL Women's (AFLW). Hyde was selected by Fremantle as a replacement player after Leah Mascall was injured during the pre-season training. Hyde played for Swan Districts in the WAFL Women's league (WAFLW).

She made her debut in the opening round of the 2021 AFL Women's season in Fremantle's win over Greater Western Sydney. It was announced she re-signed with the Dockers on 5 June 2021.

Her identical twin sister Brianna also plays football for Swan Districts.

Statistics
Statistics are correct to the end of the 2021 season.

|- style="background:#EAEAEA"
| scope="row" text-align:center | 2021
| 
| 28 || 4 || 1 || 0 || 12 || 16 || 28 || 5 || 9 || 0.3 || 0.0 || 3.0 || 4.0 || 7.0 || 1.3 || 2.3 || 0
|- class="sortbottom"
! colspan=3 | Career
! 4
! 1
! 0
! 12
! 16
! 28
! 5
! 9
! 0.3
! 0.0
! 3.0
! 4.0
! 7.0
! 1.3
! 2.3
! 0
|}

References

External links 

Living people
2002 births
Fremantle Football Club (AFLW) players
Australian rules footballers from Western Australia
Identical twins
Australian twins